Mumm 36 is a  sailboat class designed by Bruce Farr with about 100 boats built.

History
The Mumm 36 designed by Bruce Farr was built by Bénéteau, Carroll Marine, Cookson Boats and Robertson & Caine between 1993 and 1998. The name comes from the class sponsor at the time Champagne Mumm.

References

1990s sailboat type designs
Keelboats
Sailboat types built by Beneteau
Sailing yachts designed by Farr Yacht Design
Sailing yachts designed by Bruce Farr
Sailboat types built in France
Sailboat types built in South Africa
Sailboat types built in the United States
Sailboat types built in New Zealand
Beneteau